Gilbert John Landry (born December 10, 1975), also known by the stage name of Frank Lemon, is an American singer-songwriter and guitarist born in Lake Charles, Louisiana. He is a former member of Old Crow Medicine Show and a founding member of the Kitchen Syncopators. In March 2015 he released his third album, the self-titled Gill Landry, and in October 2017 came Love Rides a Dark Horse released by ATO Records and Loose Music.

Biography

Early days
Gill Landry got his first guitar when he was 5. After spending many years busking the streets of New Orleans, the Northwest, and Europe, he started The Kitchen Syncopators with his friend Woody Pines in 1998. As he tells the story:

Those songs would come in handy later when they'd moved to the Pacific Northwest. Landry recounts:

The Kitchen Syncopators recorded seven self-released CDs:

 The Kitchen Syncopators
 Jug Band and Rag Time
 Tijuana Zebra
 Pepper In My Shoe (2003)
 Yazoo City Strugglers (2004)
 Underwood (2005)
 Live From Sedona (2006)

Old Crow Medicine Show
Gill began to fill in for Critter Fuqua, lending vocals, banjo and steel guitar for Old Crow Medicine Show, joining them on tour in Europe in 2005 and appearing at the Cambridge Folk Festival. As Landry tells it:

Recovering quickly, he "went to a place called The Folkstore in Seattle, and bought a Goodtime banjo." He got a five-minute lesson from the store owner, then "practiced it for two weeks before I went to meet the boys. I played it on the Opry and at Doc Watson days. I must have just been god awful (sic)."  Something must have worked, because "they kept calling me back.

When Old Crow co-founder Chris "Critter" Fuqua officially "went on hiatus" from the group in 2007 to pursue "recovery from a longtime alcohol addiction", the group looked to Landry as a replacement. " He toured and recorded with the band until 2015, appearing on Tennessee Pusher (2008), Carry Me Back (2012), and Remedy (2014), for which they won a Grammy Award for Best Folk Album.

Regarding his third solo album, released March 2015, he says: "This album, though holding to a few similar influences as Old Crow, is very much a departure as it is more of a personal journey, musically and lyrically." Landry left Old Crow Medicine Show following the release of this record.

Solo albums
In 2007, Landry released a solo album titled The Ballad of Lawless Soirez on Nettwerk Records. "Coal Black Heaven" from this album was hailed by one reviewer as "something of a hobo haiku to the national collapse and depression looming over every hollowed-out and rusted-through US river town."

In October 2011, he self-released his second solo album titled Piety & Desire — featuring the Felice Brothers, Brandi Carlile, Jolie Holland, Ketch Secor, and Samantha Parton (of the Be Good Tanyas) — where he "creates a whole film and stereo hi-fi noir milieu" by realizing "a dozen rootsy, ambient and mostly catchy hardscrabble southwestern tinged originals."

His third, self-titled album was released by ATO Records on March 3, 2015. Leaving the "relative security of the popular roots band Old Crow Medicine Show" and suffering a "tough breakup with a one-time fiancée," forced a reevaluation of Landry's life helping to generate the "introspective, generally dark songs that pour out of him' on this album. Landry says of his "map out of the darkness":

Love Rides a Dark Horse (2017) 
Love Rides a Dark Horse was released by ATO Records & Loose in October 2017. Landry says of the impetus for the album:
The album includes contributions from Ross Holmes on fiddle (Mumford & Sons, Bruce Hornsby), Skylar Wilson on keyboard (Andrew Combs, Rayland Baxter), and Logan Matheny on drums (Roman Candle, The Rosebuds). American Songwriter notes "Landry’s looming yet subtle baritone — somewhere between Leonard Cohen, Kris Kristofferson and Dave Alvin — unspool (sic) stories of broken hearts."

Festivals and tours
Landry shared stage at Americana Music Festival in September 2015 with acts such as Loretta Lynn, Steve Earle, Pokey Lafarge, and Gillian Welch. He opened for Warren Haynes and The Wood Brothers on tour in Fall of 2015.

After touring Sweden in 2016, Landry performed at Twisterella (2016) and both the Latitude Festival in Suffolk, England and Longitude Festival in Ireland in 2017.

In 2017 and 2019 he performed concerts with singer Dianna Agron at the Café Carlyle in New York.

Film/Video
Landry contributed music for the Run Away Dog (2017) soundtrack. He appeared in Austin to Boston (2014), which chronicled four bands riding in five Volkswagen buses across three thousand miles, and featured: Ben Howard, The Staves, Nathaniel Rateliff, and Bear's Den. Landry appeared in Big Easy Express (2012) with his former band, Old Crow Medicine Show. He also appeared at the end of Be Good Tanyas video "The Littlest Birds".

References

External links
 Official website

Spotify: Gill Landry

1975 births
American street performers
American country singer-songwriters
Cajun musicians
American bluegrass musicians
Old-time musicians
American folk musicians
American country guitarists
American male guitarists
Resonator guitarists
Steel guitarists
American banjoists
Living people
Musicians from New Orleans
Writers from Lake Charles, Louisiana
Musicians from Lake Charles, Louisiana
Singer-songwriters from Louisiana
Guitarists from Louisiana
ATO Records artists
21st-century American male singers
21st-century American singers
Country musicians from Louisiana
21st-century American guitarists
Nettwerk Records artists
American male singer-songwriters